Sheng Huaren (born September 1935) was a Chinese male politician, who served as the vice chairperson of the Standing Committee of the National People's Congress.

References 

1935 births
Living people
Vice Chairpersons of the National People's Congress